The Pakistan coup attempt of 1995 or Operation Khalifa was a secretive plot hatched by renegade military officers and against the government of Benazir Bhutto, the Prime Minister of Pakistan.  The plotters aimed to overthrow the constitutional government and establish a Military Rule in Pakistan. The plot was foiled after intelligence agencies tipped off the Pakistan Army. Despite the failure, the coup attempt would weaken Bhutto's government considerably in the aftermath.

History
Benazir Bhutto's Pakistan Peoples Party won the 1988 general election after Muhammad Zia-ul-Haq's 11-year Dictatorship came to an abrupt end with his death.

Previous attempt
In 1989 members of the ISI (Pakistan Army's intelligence and espionage agency) were exposed in a sting operation as wanting to overthrow the government of Benazir Bhutto. Major Amir, the co conspirator of the notorious Operation Midnight Jackal said he liked Sharif as a political leader and wanted to make Mr.Sharif the new Prime Minister. He said Sharif was a part of his political camp and would continue the agenda of Zia-ul-Haq, the person who had launched Sharifs political careers and given his party access to public funds.

Causes 
With accusations of corruption in the country and particularly in the government circles, a level of discontent had grown in various circles. UN sanctions designed to stop Pakistan's nuclear programme also began to affect the wider economy. Officers who had been recruited under Zia-ul-Haq's Islamisation were very pro nuclear Pakistan, and wanted to continue the Nuclear Program, which was considered to be stopped by Benazir after deal with USA.
Gen. Zia-ul-Haq's Islamisation policies launched in the 1980s vastly increased the role of Deobandi Islam in public life. General Zia encouraged Fundamentalist Islamic law and religious education in all segments of Pakistani society to build his legitimacy (which had become weak after he had overthrown a popular elected leader and had suspended democracy) on being a good Muslim ruler. Resistance to the Soviet invasion of Afghanistan was hailed as a religious duty and Pakistani intelligence and military services, with the help of the CIA, recruited, trained and armed Afghan mujahideen to fight the Soviet Army. In the process a vast network of madrases and hardline mosques were established. Later this network would be used to keep Zia-ul-Haq in power and suppress Democracy, leading to the much greater problem of religious extremism and terrorism in Pakistan.

Plot 
The main accused in this failed coup attempt were Major General Zahirul Islam Abbasi, Brigadier Mustansir Billah and Qari Saifullah. While Brigadier Billah was assumed to be the ideologue of the group, the main executor was supposed to be Qari Saifullah. Major General Abbasi was serving at the time as director-general of infantry corps at the Pakistani army high command in Rawalpindi. With the help of sympathetic military officers, the group allegedly began plotting against the civilian government of Benazir Bhutto and the army chief Gen. Abdul Waheed Kakar.  It was claimed that they planned to assassinate Bhutto, Kakar, senior cabinet ministers and the military chiefs to bring about a corruption free government in Pakistan.  Acting on a tip-off from the then Maj. Gen. Ali Kuli Khan Khattak, who was then the director-general of military intelligence (DGMI), the then chief of general staff (CGS) Lt. Gen. Jehangir Karamat, who later became the Chief of the Army Staff suppressed the coup by arresting 36 army officers and 20 civilians in Rawalpindi and the capital Islamabad.

Qari Saifullah saved himself by becoming an "approver" (government witness) on behalf of the prosecution during the trial.  Based on this deal, Qari Saifullah was given freedom in 1996 and did not face a trial. Without his testimony, it would not have been possible to convict the other officers. While Qari Saifullah gained his freedom, the other alleged co-conspirators were convicted.

Other views

Professor Lawrence Ziring, former president of the American Institute of Pakistani studies offered a different view of events. In his 2003 book, "Pakistan at the cross currents of history", Ziring said there was "little evidence to implicate the accused" (p. 239). He also suggested that the alleged coup was little more than an attempt by Bhutto to bring the military establishment closer under her control. (p. 239) He also describes Bhutto as lashing out against her critics in November 1995 and accusing (without proof) those involved as having planned to kill her, most of the army command and the president of Pakistan.

Aftermath 
Benazir Bhutto was succeeded in 1997 by Nawaz Sharif, who would dismiss army chief Gen. Karamat and Lt. Gen. Khattak. Sharif maintained links with Hardline Islamic groups and provided financial support for the group. He also helped Muhammad Rafiq Tarar –Tarar served as senior justice of the Supreme Court of Pakistan from 1991 to 1994 and as the 28th Chief Justice of Lahore High Court from 1989 to 1991-a supporter of Tableeghi Jamaat – become the President of Pakistan.

The alleged plotters were convicted by a military court and awarded different sentences ranging from 2 to 14 years. The highest sentence was given to Brigadier BiLLAH (14 years). Major Gen. Abbasi was given a 7-year term in jail. His imprisonment started in 1995 and he was to remain in prison until 2002 (7 years). During his period of imprisonment, Abbasi lodged an appeal to Supreme Court of Pakistan in 1997 for a review of his case. This was refused since he had been convicted by a military court, and it was outside the purview of civilian courts. He was not granted release. However based on good conduct during his prison term, Abbasi was given early release from prison by General Pervez Musharraf in October 1999, i.e. within four years.  With his military career over, Abbasi moved to organise a political party with the aim of creating awareness and establishing a Hardline Sunni Islamic law through peaceful parliamentary legislation . Later Abbasi formed another political party called the Azmat-e-Islam party with the same objectives. He led a quiet life in Rawalpindi, and delivered lectures to audiences on the values of religious life and on political analysis until his death in July 2009.

Azmat-e-Islam and Bedar Pakistan are in fact two separate parties headed by Zaheer ul Islam Abbasi and Mr Abdul Razaq Mian, respectively.

All of the other alleged plotters have also been released from prison and are now settled in Pakistan leading normal lives as citizens.

Footnotes

See also
Zahirul Islam Abbasi
Zia-ul-Haq's Islamization
Benazir Bhutto
Islamism
Siachen conflict
History of the Kashmir conflict
History of Pakistan
Inter-Services Intelligence
Pakistani Armed Forces

References 
 Lawrence Ziring, Pakistan at the cross currents of history, 2003
 Tabhligi Jamaat 
 
 
 
 
 Terror links
 Strategic Affairs Analysis

External links 
 Kashmir Telegraph
 

Conflicts in 1995
Political history of Pakistan
Military history of Pakistan
Military coups in Pakistan
1995 in Pakistan
1990s coups d'état and coup attempts
Coup d'état attempts in Asia
Government of Benazir Bhutto